Helma Knorscheidt (born 31 December 1956 in Nauendorf, Saxony-Anhalt) is an East German shot putter.

She competed for the sports club SC Chemie Halle during her active career.

As a veteran Helma Knorscheidt (now married Teuscher) is active as well. She took part at several World Masters Athletics Championships and European Veterans Athletics Championships. She was most successful by winning the shot put competition age group W50 at World Championships 2007 in Riccione (Italy) (14,40 m using 3 kg shot) and gaining the world record in same age group at European Championship 2008 in Ljubljana (result 14,94 m)(excelled in 2009 by Alexandra Marghieva)

Achievements

References

1956 births
Living people
People from Saalekreis
East German female shot putters
SC Chemie Halle athletes
World Athletics Championships medalists
Universiade medalists in athletics (track and field)
Universiade gold medalists for East Germany
Universiade silver medalists for East Germany
Universiade bronze medalists for East Germany
Medalists at the 1977 Summer Universiade
Medalists at the 1979 Summer Universiade
Medalists at the 1981 Summer Universiade
Sportspeople from Saxony-Anhalt